Park Kyung-min may refer to:
 Park Kyung-min (footballer, born 1990)
 Park Kyung-min (footballer, born 1999)